Thai Air Cargo (T2 Cargo), was a cargo airline based in Bangkok, Thailand, operating from 2004 to 2006.

History
Thai Air Cargo was established in December 2004 as a joint venture between a Thai logistics firm, Commercial Transport International, or CTI Holdings (51%) and Australian airline Qantas (49%).

Thai Air Cargo was to initially target markets in Japan, China, India and Europe.

In 2005, the company announced it was to wet lease a McDonnell Douglas MD-11 from US-based World Airways.

Beginning operations at a time when Thailand's national flag carrier Thai Airways International was focused more on its passenger business, Thai Air Cargo filled a niche and appeared to be doing good business, with 95% load factors.

However, in March 2006, Thailand's Civil Aviation Department said it was withdrawing the cargo carrier's license, and it appears the airline has gone out of business.

References

 Putzger, Ian (March 2005). "Tigers' cargo purr", Air Cargo World. (Retrieved 8 March 2006).

Qantas
Defunct cargo airlines
Cargo airlines of Thailand
Defunct airlines of Thailand
Airlines established in 2004
Airlines disestablished in 2006
2006 disestablishments in Thailand
Companies based in Bangkok
Thai companies established in 2004